Paper Towns is a 2015 American romantic mystery comedy-drama film, directed by Jake Schreier, based on the 2008 novel of the same name by John Green. The film was adapted for the screen by Scott Neustadter and Michael H. Weber, the same team that wrote the first film adaption of another of Green's novels, The Fault in Our Stars. The film stars Nat Wolff and Cara Delevingne and was released on July 24, 2015, in the United States by 20th Century Fox. The film follows the coming of age and search by the protagonist, Quentin "Q" Jacobsen (Wolff), for Margo Roth Spiegelman (Delevingne), his childhood friend and object of affection. In the process, Quentin explores the relationship with his friends including his compatibility with Margo.

It grossed over $85 million worldwide after the theatrical release, against a $12 million budget. It was released on Blu-ray and DVD on October 20, 2015, and grossed over $9 million in total domestic video sales. The film received mixed reviews.

Plot

Quentin "Q" Jacobsen lives across the street from Margo Roth Spiegelman in Jefferson Park, a subdivision of Orlando, Florida. She is a childhood friend from whom he has drifted over nine years after they discovered the corpse of a local lawyer, Robert Joyner, who killed himself after his divorce. Unbeknownst to Margo, Quentin has been infatuated with her since they became neighbors. After reaching adolescence, Margo becomes one of the popular girls, with an adventurous reputation, at Jefferson Park High School. In contrast, Quentin is kind and unassertive, but unpopular among his peers. His friends are other outcasts, Benjamin "Ben" Starling, and Marcus "Radar" Lincoln.

One night, Margo climbs through Quentin's window and recruits him for an all-night, revenge road trip. Margo discovers that her boyfriend, Jason "Jase" Worthington, was unfaithful (having sex) with one of her friends, Rebecca "Becca" Arrington. After buying supplies, they pull humiliating pranks on Jason and Rebecca, and their friends, including Margo's best friend, Lacey Pemberton. Margo accuses Lacey of not telling her about the affair. (It is revealed later that Lacey was  unaware of the affair until she was pranked). The event gives Quentin hope that he finally has a chance to develop a closer relationship with Margo. He begins to learn how to assert himself and to take chances.

The next day Margo does not come to school, and after a few days, some consider her missing, others just conclude she left for an undisclosed location. Margo's parents will not report her missing to the police since she has run away from home repeatedly before, and they believe their daughter will return eventually. After seeing a recently attached Woody Guthrie poster on her bedroom wall,  Quentin realizes that Margo deliberately left clues for him as to where she would be going. Benjamin and Marcus start searching for other clues in hopes of finding Margo so that Quentin can confess his feelings to her. Quentin bribes Margo's sister Ruthie so that they can look for the clues to Margo's whereabouts in her room.

When Quentin, Benjamin, and Marcus attend a party at Jason's house, Lacey argues with Rebecca over her betrayal of Margo with Jason. Because of her loyalty to Margo and her revulsion towards Rebecca and Jason's promiscuity, Lacey leaves in disgust. Quentin finds Lacey in a bathroom and gets to know her, discovering that, beneath her superficial exterior, she is an intelligent and compassionate person, and they become friends. After finding more clues, Quentin starts to put them together and is led with his friends to an old gift store at an abandoned strip mall. They find a map that Margo used, and discover that she has been hiding in Agloe, a paper town located in the State of New York. Quentin and his friends, including Marcus's girlfriend Angela, begin a two-day road trip to find Margo, hoping to be home in time for their prom after they find her. They bond on the way, as Benjamin and Lacey are going to the prom together; Marcus and Angela consummate their relationship. 
 
When they do not find Margo where they expect her to be, Quentin stays while the others return home with his car. He finds Margo on the street and admits his affection for her, but she does not feel the same way. She ran away from home to escape her dysfunctional family life, to figure out who she is. She left the clues to let Quentin know that she is safe, not to invite him to follow her. Margo remains in Agloe. Quentin books a bus ticket home, and they share a farewell kiss. Before he leaves, Margo tells him that she has been in contact with Ruthie since leaving Orlando. Returning to Orlando, Quentin enjoys the company of his friends at the prom. After graduation, he continues spending time with them throughout the summer before they all leave for college.

Cast

 Nat Wolff as Quentin "Q" Jacobsen, the film's lead protagonist
 Josiah Cerio as young "Q"
 Cara Delevingne as Margo Roth Spiegelman, Quentin's childhood friend and the object of his affection
 Hannah Alligood as young Margo
 Halston Sage as Lacey Pemberton, Margo's best friend, she later becomes one of Quentin's friends and Benjamin's prom date
 Austin Abrams as Benjamin "Ben" Starling, one of Quentin's best friends
 Kendall McIntyre as young Ben
 Justice Smith as Marcus "Radar" Lincoln, one of Quentin's best friends
 Jaz Sinclair as Angela, Marcus's girlfriend, and prom date, who later joins Quentin's circle of friends
 Cara Buono as Connie Jacobsen, Quentin's mother
 Griffin Freeman as Jason "Jase" Worthington, Margo's former boyfriend and Quentin's nemesis
 Caitlin Carver as Rebecca "Becca" Arrington, Margo's former friend-turned-nemesis and Jason's new girlfriend
 Meg Crosbie as Ruthie Spiegelman, Margo's sister
 Susan Macke Miller as Debbie Spiegelman, Margo and Ruthie's mother
 Tom Hillmann as Josh Spiegelman, Margo and Ruthie's father
 RJ Shearer as Chuck Parson, Jason's best friend, Lacey's former boyfriend, and Quentin's nemesis  
 Jim Coleman as Detective Otis Warren with the Orlando Police Department
 Lane Lovegrove as Robert Joyner, the local man whose corpse was found by Margo and Quentin after he committed suicide
 Ansel Elgort (cameo) as Mason, the convenience store clerk who is infatuated with Lacey
 Stevie Ray Dallimore as Hank Jacobsen, Quentin's father  
 John Green (voice) as Dwight Arrington, Rebecca's father

Production

Pre-production
The rights to the film had been optioned since at least 2008; Green wrote the first draft of the screenplay himself.

Although the novel features a scene set in SeaWorld the location was changed after the release of the CNN documentary Blackfish which was highly critical of the theme park keeping orcas. On March 24, 2014, Green announced via Twitter that Nat Wolff would  be playing the protagonist Quentin "Q" Jacobsen. Cara Delevingne's casting as Margo Roth Spiegelman was announced the following September.

Filming
Although the novel is set primarily in Orlando, Florida, North Carolina's tax incentives for filmmakers made it the affordable choice for principal photography according to Green. The crew was encouraged to finish filming before December 31, 2014, the date when certain tax incentives would expire.

Filming began on November 3, 2014, in and around Charlotte, North Carolina and concluded on December 19, 2014. On November 17–18, filming was due to take place at the Mooresville Arts Depot in Mooresville, North Carolina but due to weather conditions the schedule was moved to November 18–19, when the film was shot on location both days. Production was set to be moved to Wilmington, North Carolina on December 2 to film the high school scenes with extras, but the venue was changed and filming took place in Cabarrus County, North Carolina outside of Charlotte instead. Between December 2 through 8, the crew filmed at Central Cabarrus High School in Concord, North Carolina, which was transformed into "Jefferson Park High School". Cast members were dressed for warm weather even though it was cold.

Release

The film was originally supposed to be released on July 31, 2015. The release date was later changed to June 19 and then to June 5, the day before the first anniversary of The Fault in Our Stars film release. In March 2015, 20th Century Fox moved the release date to July 24, 2015, which was assigned to the release of Poltergeist. It was released on May 22 instead. To tie in with the release of the film, an extra 1.5 million paperback copies of the book were printed.

Music
The soundtrack consists of new and previously released material from Twin Shadow, Santigold, Grouplove, Haim, Vampire Weekend, The Mountain Goats, The War on Drugs, Galantis as well as Nat Wolff and his brother Alex. Atlantic Records' President of Film and TV, and soundtrack producer, Kevin Weaver, and music supervisor Season Kent, (both of whom worked on the soundtrack for The Fault in Our Stars in 2014) served as the soundtrack's producers.

Charts

Reception

Box office
, Paper Towns has grossed $32 million in North America and $53.5 million in other territories for a worldwide total of $85.5 million, against a budget of $12 million.

In the United States and Canada, the film opened at 3,031 theaters on July 24, 2015, alongside two other films, Pixels and Southpaw. Box office pundits projected the film would earn around $20 million in its opening weekend, facing direct competition with Pixels and the holdover of Ant-Man and Minions. Box office analysts also noted that it could have easily over-performed and had a higher debut, if teen girls – who are its primary target – had embraced the film and word-of-mouth had gone viral. Paper Towns made $2 million from its Thursday night showings, which began at 9 p.m. at 2,500 theaters; 500 of the screens had a live-streaming event before the film's screening. It then earned $6.3 million on its opening day from 3,301 theaters. In its opening weekend, the film grossed $12.5 million and finished 6th at the box office, falling short of industry projections and earning much less than the $48 million opening weekend gross of The Fault in Our Stars, a 2014 adaption of John Green's novel of the same name.

It had a major worldwide release on July 24, 2015, in 34 markets grossing $7.9 million from 3,905 screens in 39 markets. It opened in Brazil on July 10, 2015 – the first country to release the film – and earned $2.38 million in its opening weekend, from 630 screens, debuting at third place at the Brazilian box office, behind Minions and Terminator Genisys. However, in terms of admissions, it was second behind the former film. It had notable openings in Mexico ($1.54 million) and in Australia ($1.53 million). It was released in 18 additional countries in late July and early August, including Germany, Belgium, and the Netherlands.

It was released on Blu-ray and DVD on October 20, 2015, and grossed over $9 million in total domestic video sales.

Critical response
Paper Towns received mixed reviews from film critics. On the review aggregator website Rotten Tomatoes, the film has a 58% approval rating, based on 141 reviews, with a rating average of 5.8/10. The site's critical consensus reads, "Paper Towns isn't as deep or moving as it wants to be, yet it's still earnest, well-acted, and thoughtful enough to earn a place in the hearts of teen filmgoers of all ages." On Metacritic, the film has a score of 56 out of 100, based on 34 critics, indicating "mixed or average reviews". In CinemaScore polls conducted during its opening weekend, cinema audiences gave the film an average grade of "B+" on an A+ to F scale.

Accolades

Notes

References

External links
 
 
 
 
 
 

2015 films
2010s coming-of-age comedy-drama films
2010s mystery comedy-drama films
2010s road comedy-drama films
2015 romantic comedy-drama films
2010s teen comedy-drama films
2010s teen romance films
20th Century Fox films
American coming-of-age comedy-drama films
American films about revenge
American high school films
American mystery comedy-drama films
American road comedy-drama films
American romantic comedy-drama films
American teen comedy-drama films
American teen romance films
Coming-of-age romance films
Films about bullying
Films about friendship
Films about missing people
Films based on American novels
Films based on mystery novels
Films based on romance novels
Films based on works by John Green (author)
Films based on young adult literature
Films set in New York (state)
Films set in Orlando, Florida
Films set in Pennsylvania
Films shot in North Carolina
Films with screenplays by Scott Neustadter and Michael H. Weber
Teen mystery films
Temple Hill Entertainment films
TSG Entertainment films
Films produced by Wyck Godfrey
2010s English-language films
2010s American films